Tomb of Sand (originally titled Ret Samadhi)  is a 2018 Hindi-language novel by Indian author Geetanjali Shree. It was translated into English by U.S. translator Daisy Rockwell. In 2022, the book became the first novel translated from an Indian language to win the International Booker Prize.

Plot 
The book traces the transformative journey of  80-year-old Ma, who becomes depressed after the death of her husband. She then decides to travel to Pakistan, confronting trauma that had remained unresolved since she was a teenager who survived the Partition riots. The story is fictional.

Critical reception 
The novel received praise from book critics in India and elsewhere. Writing in The Hindu, reviewer Mini Kapoor described it as "a stunningly powerful story about stories that never end".  Novelist Alka Saraogi, writing in The Book Review, praised the novel for "its sweeping imagination and sheer power of language, unprecedented and uninhibited".  Frank Wynne, chair of the 2022 International Booker judges, said it was "enormously engaging and charming and funny and light, despite the various subjects it’s dealing with". He added that Rockwell's translation was "stunningly realised, the more so because so much of the original depends on wordplay, on the sounds and cadences of Hindi".

Accolades 
In addition to winning the 2022 International Booker Prize and 2022 Warwick Prize for Women in Translation in its English translation, the French translation (Ret Samadhi, au-delà de la frontière: Éditions des Femmes, Paris, 2020; tr. Annie Montaut) was shortlisted for the 2021 Émile Guimet Prize for Asian Literature.

References

External links
: Rajkamal Prakashan (Hindi)
: Tilted Axis Press (English)  
: Penguin Books India (English)

2018 Indian novels
Novels set in India
Novels set in Pakistan
Hindi-language novels
International Booker Prize-winning works
Fictional books
Partition of India in fiction